Prestonwood Baptist Church is a Baptist multi-site megachurch, based in Plano, Texas. It is affiliated with the Southern Baptist Convention. It is one of the largest churches in America, with a membership of over 45,000 and a weekly attendance of around 17,000.

The North Campus also has a school (K-10 as of fall 2020 with plans to expand one grade each year, so that the Class of 2023 will be North's first graduating class).

History

Prestonwood was founded on February 6, 1977, in North Dallas, as a mission church of Northway Baptist Church. Under founding pastor Bill Weber, the new church grew considerably, and in 1979 moved into a permanent facility near the corner of Arapaho and Hillcrest Roads in Dallas.

By 1988, Prestonwood had grown to 11,000 members; that same year, Pastor Weber confessed to an extramarital affair and stepped down from the pulpit.  Behind the scenes, however, Weber actively sought to regain his position as pastor; when he was unable to do so he convinced several of the church's wealthier members—including cosmetics magnate Mary Kay Ash—to support a new church he was starting.

In 1989, Dr. Jack Graham replaced Weber as senior pastor of Prestonwood, by this time considered a "megachurch" because of its rapid expansion into one of the fastest-growing churches in the United States.  By the mid-1990s, it became apparent that the church had outgrown its north Dallas home; the facility was landlocked with no ability to expand. In 1994, the church's leadership began plans for a 7,000-seat worship center in Plano.  Services were first held on May 2, 1999.  The church continued to expand its facilities throughout the next decade.  Soon after the opening of the new worship center, the first phase of the new Prestonwood Sports and Fitness Center was completed. In August 2003, the church completed the second phase of the building, which featured a new chapel, a 100-foot-tall (30m) "Faith Tower" topped by a cross, a student ministry area, restaurant and commons, additional space for Bible fellowship and administrative offices.  Two years later, the Prestonwood Christian Academy Upper School opened on the west side of the church campus.

The church reached the 46,000-member mark in 2019, with regular attendance at worship services averaging around 17,000.

In June 1989, a youth music minister at Prestonwood Baptist Church, John Langworthy, admitted to church officials that he had molested at least one student in the late 1980s; he was fired, but as Church Officials failed to report it to the authorities (as was required under the State Family Code), he was able to go on to become a youth music minister at Morrison Heights Baptist Church in Clinton, Mississippi, where he was later accused of abusing young boys again. In March 2013, a decade-long church member, Chris Tynes, was ordered off church premises and reported to the police as a 'suspicious person' after asking about the Langworthy incident.

In May 2022, Guidepost Solutions released an independent report on the incident, saying that Dr. Graham "allowed an accused abuser of young boys to be dismissed quietly in 1989 without reporting the abuse to police. The accused abuser, John Langworthy, later was charged with abusing young boys in Mississippi in 2011." 

In May 2008, 52-year-old Joe Barron, a minister at the church, was arrested for soliciting sex from an officer posing online as a 13-year-old girl.  Two days later, Senior Pastor Jack Graham addressed the scandal from the pulpit. In his address, Dr. Graham said the accused pastor had been asked to resign and had done so.

Campuses 
Prestonwood operates two church campuses: Plano (the Plano Campus, which houses full services in both English and Spanish, as well as smaller fellowships to other ethnic groups) and Prosper (the North Campus).  The Lewisville branch of the Spanish services are held at Northview Baptist Church, an existing and independent Southern Baptist congregation.

References

External links
 

 
Baptist churches in Texas
Churches in the Dallas–Fort Worth metroplex
Evangelical megachurches in the United States
Megachurches in Texas
Buildings and structures in Plano, Texas
Christian organizations established in 1977
1977 establishments in Texas
Churches in Collin County, Texas
Evangelical churches in Texas
Churches completed in 1999
Southern Baptist Convention churches
Baptist multisite churches